Swanston is a rural locality in the local government area (LGA) of Southern Midlands in the Central LGA region of Tasmania. The 2016 census recorded a population of 19 for the state suburb of Swanston.

History 
Swanston is a confirmed locality. 

A town of this name was proclaimed for this area in June, 1858 by Governor Sir Henry Young, but it was never developed.

Geography
Most of the boundaries are survey lines. The Little Swanport River flows through the locality before forming part of the north-eastern boundary.

Road infrastructure 
Route C310 (Stonehenge Road) leads to Swanston Road, which provides access to the locality.

References

Towns in Tasmania
Localities of Southern Midlands Council